Nikolett Szepesi (born September 11, 1987) is a Hungarian swimmer from Budapest.

Biography 
In 2010, she was suspended for one year due to doping/retirement rule violation.

Awards
 Hungarian swimmer of the Year (1): 2007

References

1987 births
Living people
Hungarian female swimmers
Female backstroke swimmers
Swimmers at the 2004 Summer Olympics
Swimmers at the 2008 Summer Olympics
Olympic swimmers of Hungary
European Aquatics Championships medalists in swimming
Doping cases in swimming
Swimmers from Budapest